Song Ji-ho (born April 06, 1995) is a South Korean actor.

Filmography

Films

Television series

References

External links
 

1995 births
Living people
Male actors from Busan
21st-century South Korean male actors
South Korean male television actors
South Korean male film actors